Maartje Lena "Marleen" de Pater-van der Meer (19 November 1950 – 13 December 2015) was a Dutch politician, she served as member of the House of Representatives for the Christian Democratic Appeal between 2001 and 2010. Before her time in the House she was active in the municipal politics of Zutphen. After her period as MP she was interim mayor of Muiden until her death.

Career
Van der Meer was born on 19 November 1950 in Hekelingen. She followed her primary and secondary education in Spijkenisse obtaining her diploma in 1966. Afterwards she studied childcare at the vocational university in Zetten between 1967 and 1971.

Van der Meer married in 1972 and took the name of her husband. She was a teacher between 1972 and 1974 and again between 1983 and 1989.

Van der Meer became member of the Anti-Revolutionary Party in 1970. She joined the municipal council of Zutphen for the party in 1980 and served for nearly 18 years. Between 1990 and 1998 she was concurrently alderman, serving six of those years as deputy mayor. From 1999 to 2001 she was interim director of the Stichting "Kerk en Wereld".

In 2001 de Pater-van der Meer was elected to the House of Representatives for the Christian Democratic Appeal. She was member between 6 February 2001 and 17 June 2010. In the House she concerned herself with the fight against human trafficking and with raising the legal age of prostitution. She was invested as a Knight of the Order of Orange-Nassau on occasion of her departure from the House on 16 June 2010.

After her time at the national political level De Pater-van der Meer returned to municipal politics and became interim mayor of Muiden in September 2010. She served until her death in Zutphen on 13 December 2015. De Pater-van der Meer had been appointed to oversee the merger of the municipalities of Muiden, Bussum, Naarden and Weesp.

References

External links
  Parlement.com biography

1950 births
2015 deaths
Aldermen in Gelderland
People from Zutphen
Christian Democratic Appeal politicians
Dutch schoolteachers
Knights of the Order of Orange-Nassau
Mayors in North Holland
Members of the House of Representatives (Netherlands)
Municipal councillors in Gelderland
People from Spijkenisse
Women mayors of places in the Netherlands
20th-century Dutch politicians
20th-century Dutch women politicians
21st-century Dutch politicians
21st-century Dutch women politicians